The Chinese Workers' and Peasants' Red Army or Chinese Workers' and Peasants' Revolutionary Army, commonly known as the Chinese Red Army or simply the Red Army, was the armed forces of the Chinese Communist Party from 1928 to 1937. It was formed when Communist elements of the National Revolutionary Army splintered and mutinied in the Nanchang Uprising. The Red Army was reincorporated into the National Revolutionary Army as part of the Second United Front with the Kuomintang to fight against the Japanese during the Second Sino-Japanese War of 1937–1945. In the later stages of the Chinese Civil War they splintered off once again and renamed the People's Liberation Army.

History

Formation (late 1920s) 
In the summer of 1926, the CCP took over the two divisions of the Chinese Nationalist Party forces and led a military mutiny. Nationalist forces General He Long commanded the 20th Corps to join them. They had a total of 20,000 soldiers and planned to occupy Guangzhou. However, they were defeated before they reached Guangzhou with only a few thousand men surviving the battle. Zhu De led a column of survivors to Hunan Province to fight in the Autumn Harvest Uprising where they were defeated again. After the failed uprisings, Mao Zedong took over command of the 1,000 survivors and established a revolutionary base area in the Jinggang Mountains. The two armies joined forces in the following year. In the winter of 1927, the CCP planned to conquer Guangzhou; however, the uprising failed and thousands of insurgents were killed by the Nationalist forces of General Li Jishen.

Between 1928 and 1929, the CCP launched multiple uprisings. Although most of them failed, several small-scale units were created, such as Mao Zedong and Zhu De's Fourth Army, which totaled about 6,000 men in the summer of 1928 and fought in Jiangxi Province. Also in the summer of 1928, Peng Dehuai, the Nationalist forces Regimental Commander, led a military mutiny. A Nanchang Uprising survivor, He Long, also created an army in his hometown, with former government soldiers as the main fighting force.

Early success (early 1930s) 
In early 1930, more red armies were created and the number of red soldiers grew rapidly. By the summer of 1930, the Chinese Red Army had grown to more than 100,000 soldiers and had several base areas, such as in southern and northern Jiangxi Province, western Hubei Province, and eastern Hunan Province, among others. Peng Dehuai's Fifth Army attacked and occupied Changsha, the capital of Hunan Province. After the attack, Jiangxi Province became the largest base area of the Chinese Red Army. In the autumn of 1930, Deng Xiaoping's Seventh Army left its base area in Guangxi Province.

In 1931, the Chinese Red Army defeated the Nationalist forces three times with a large-scale attack, causing the Nationalist forces to lose nearly 100,000 soldiers. Several smaller red armies came together and formed a group army. In the summer of 1931, General Zhang Guotao arrived at the Fourth Red Army's base area and took over the army. Most of the Fourth Red Army's senior officers were killed by him, including Xu Jishen, Zhou Weijiong, and Xiaofang. Similar movements also occurred in western Hubei Province; in the spring of 1931, Xia Xi took over He Long's army and killed most of his senior officers including Duan Dechang.

In the fall of 1932, the Nationalist forces gathered 300,000 soldiers to attack the Fourth Red Army. Most of the Nationalist forces' future generals participated in this battle such as Huang Wei, Du Yuming, Sun Li-jen, and others. Having lost more than half of its soldiers, the Fourth Red Army was defeated and had to retreat from its base area. He Long's Third Army also sustained significant loses, with more than 10,000 soldiers losing their lives after leaving western Hubei Province. During this time, there were also several battles between the Nationalist forces and Jiangxi Province's First Red Army.

In the spring of 1933, the First Red Army defeated the Nationalist forces' fourth large-scale attack and eliminated two and a half of its elite divisions. Several of the Nationalist forces' generals were also captured. In 1933, the Fourth Red Army arrived at Sichuan Province and recruited more than 80,000 soldiers. This caused Sichuan Province's warlord Liu Xiang to gather 200,000 troops to attack the Fourth Red Army in autumn.

Defeats (mid 1930s) 
In 1934, the Nationalist forces purchased new German weapons and launched a fifth large-scale attack on the Red Army's base area in Jiangxi Province. The First Red Army lost more than 50,000 soldiers in this battle and had to leave Jiangxi Province to establish a new base. This was the beginning of the Long March. About 30,000 soldiers were left to defend the base areas in southern China. During the same time, the Fourth Red Army defeated Liu Xiang's attacks, who lost more than 80,000 soldiers in battle. Before the First Red Army began the Long March, Xiao Ke's Sixth Legion arrived at eastern Guizhou Province and joined forces with He Long's Third Army. After this, the Third Army changed its designation to Second Legion.

In the autumn of 1935, the First Red Army arrived in northern Shaanxi Province with only 6,000 soldiers after losing more than 80,000 along the way. During this same time, the Fourth Red Army moved to northern Sichuan Province and planned to attack Chengdu. By the end of 1935, they had lost more than 40,000 soldiers and were defeated. Therefore, they were forced to move to southern Gansu Province and wait for He Long's Second Legion and Sixth Legion to arrive.

Formation of a new Army (late 1930s) 
In the summer of 1936, the Second Legion, the Sixth Legion and the Thirty-Second Army formed a new group army. It was named the Second Red Army and He Long was tasked with being its commander. The Second Red Army and Fourth Red Army arrived in north Shaanxi Province in the autumn of 1936. Around the same time, roughly 21,000 soldiers from the Fourth Red Army attacked Gansu Province, wanting to find a way to the Soviet Union. By the end of 1936, they were defeated by the Nationalist forces' General Ma Bufang, with more than 6,000 soldiers being captured. Only Xu Xiangqian and other senior officers survived. Because of this great failure, the Fourth Red Army's Commander in Chief Zhang Guotao was stripped of his military power.

When the anti-Japanese war broke out on July 7, 1937, the communist military forces were nominally integrated into the National Revolutionary Army of the Republic of China, forming the Eighth Route Army and the New Fourth Army units. The First Red Army was integrated into the 115th Division of the Nationalist forces. The Second Red Army was integrated into the 120th Division of the Nationalist forces. The Fourth Red Army was integrated into the 129th Division of the Nationalist forces. These three divisions had 45,000 soldiers in all. 10,000 soldiers were left to defend the base areas in northern Shaanxi. In southern China, the New Fourth Army's 10,000 soldiers acted as a guerrilla force. At the time of the Second Sino-Japanese War, these two armies contained one million armed men.

After the Communist Party assumed power in 1949, veterans of the Red Army were venerated in mainland Chinese culture and are distinguished from those who joined to fight with the Communist Party after the integration with the Nationalists, or during the second civil war.

Major events 

 August 1, 1927: Nanchang Uprising
 1927: Autumn Harvest Uprising
 1927: Guangzhou Uprising
 1930 to 1931: First Encirclement Campaign
 1931: Second Encirclement Campaign
 July 1931: Third Encirclement Campaign
 1932 to 1933: Fourth Encirclement Campaign
 1933 to 1934: Fifth Encirclement Campaign
 1934 to 1936: Long March

Political and ideological roles 
In the view of the Communist Party, participation of the masses in the Red Army was significant beyond the direct concerns of manpower and material support. It was also viewed as a political process through which the masses would evolve into "masters of the state." According to Mao, "[T]he Red Army is not an entity for fighting only. Its major task (or function) is to mobilize the masses. Fighting is only a means." This process involved the Red Army's significant responsibility for educating, organizing, and mobilizing the masses, functioning like the mobile embodiment of the Communist Party in addition to its military roles. Academic Cai Xiang writes that the Red Army's ability to function in this way helps explain why despite the weak industrial base in revolutionary China, a proletarian party nonetheless successfully developed.

Main leadership

Main leadership of the Red Army headquarters 
In May 1933, the Chinese Red Army began to build a military regularization system. They established the Red Army headquarters on the front line to command operations.

Commanders of group armies 
The Chinese Red Army often claimed they had three group armies, although, by 1931, the Second Red Army was much smaller than the other two.

Main leadership of base areas 
In 1930, the Chinese Red Army had established several base areas. Though the designations of the Red Army changed frequently, the main leadership of base areas did not change significantly.

Personnel

Military rebellion 
In the early phases of its establishment, most of the Chinese Red Army's military officers were made up of former officers of the Nationalist forces, with most of them joining the Red Army secretly between 1925 and 1928. Many of these officers were killed in the first years of the war. The largest rebellion was the Ningdu Uprising which occurred in the winter of 1931. General Dong Zhentang, head of the 26th Route Army of the National Revolutionary Army and his 17,000 soldiers were the first to join the First Red Army. After the uprising, the Nationalist Party strengthened its control over the army, making launching a military rebellion more difficult. Despite this, General Zhang Guotao, who regarded the former officers of the Nationalist forces with disdain, lead an attack in the summer of 1931 which killed more than 2,500 of the Fourth Red Army's middle and senior officers who originated from the Nationalist forces.

Ranks and titles 
The Chinese Red Army had no ranks. Officers and soldiers were considered equal. Early on, the officers were elected by the soldiers; however, during the later parts of the war this system was eliminated. From regiment to army, the command system at each level had four commanders: commander, political commissar, chief of staff, and director of political department, with the political commissar holding the most power.

Military education 
As the number of former officers of the Nationalist forces that made up the Red Army decreased throughout the war, the Red Army began to develop military education for the new officers who were formerly farmers. Each base area established its own military academies, usually using captured enemy officers as teachers. The enterprise was very successful, and by 1936 most of the Red Army's military officers were former farmers.

Purges 
In 1931, commanders determined that there were a number of spies in the Red Army. This issue became particularly prevalent when the First Red Army's Chief of Staff Zhu Yunqing was assassinated by a spy in a hospital. After this, each Red Army began to judge and execute the officers and soldiers who were suspected. In 1931, the First Red Army executed about 4,000 men. The Fourth Red Army and Third Red Army also executed thousands of officers, especially senior officers. These purges were likely one of the reasons why the Third and Fourth Armies were rapidly defeated in 1932.

Militia 
Typically a Red Army's base area was surrounded by enemy forces. To protect the base area from enemy attack, the Red Army recruited red guards. The red guards were commanded by officers of the local soviet. When large-scale war broke out, the red guards were responsible for the logistical support of the Red Army and supplied new soldiers for the Red Army. For example, in the winter of 1932, Xiao Ke's Eighth Army had 2,200 red soldiers and 10,000 red guards. The red guards' officers were not always loyal. In the spring of 1933, one of the red guards' officers killed 29th Army's commander Chen Qianlun and surrendered to the Nationalist forces.

Organization
Usually each Chinese Red Army's army or legion had three or two infantry divisions. Each division has three infantry regiments and one mortar company. In different time the number of one division's soldiers is different. In the beginning every division had about 1000 or 2000 men. From 1933 to 1936, one division usually had about 5000 or 6000 men.

1928
After several uprisings, the Chinese Red Army had several armies in the summer of 1928.

1930
The Chinese Red Army became stronger than before during the summer of 1930.

1932
In the summer of 1932, the Chinese Red Army had formed three main forces before the Fourth Encirclement Campaign.

1934
The Chinese Red Army had nearly 200,000 men in the winter of 1934.

1936
Most of Chinese Red Army had arrived in northern Shaanxi Province by autumn 1936. Only a minority of them stayed in southern China.

Equipment

Rifles 
The Chinese Red Army's weapons were all captured from the enemy army, with the most important and useful weapon being the rifle. In the winter of 1934, the First Red Army's twelve divisions had 72,300 soldiers and 25,300 rifles. Compared to the First Red Army, the Fourth Red Army had more rifles which allowed it to recruit many new soldiers in Sichuan Province. However, the local forces lacked rifles. In the summer of 1934, Xun Huaizhou's Seventh Legion had 6,000 soldiers but only 1,200 rifles, which lead to the Seventh Legion's quick defeat when they attempted to attack Fuzhou.

Machine guns 
Typically every Chinese Red Army's regiment had one machine gun company, with every company having six or more machine guns. The machine gun equipment rate of the Red Army was no less than that of the Nationalist forces' elite troops. This was one of the important reasons why the Red Army was able to defeat the Nationalist forces on many occasions. The most common machine guns were the MG08, ZB vz. 26, M1918 Browning Automatic Rifle, and Hotchkiss M1914 machine gun.

Cold weapons 
Due to the lack of rifles, the Chinese Red Army was forced to use cold weapons such as broadswords, spears, sabres, and so on. In particular, most of the soldiers from the Red Army's militia troops were armed with cold weapons at all times. In the autumn of 1930, Zeng Zhongsheng commanded 30,000 red guards who were armed with cold weapons. Despite the overwhelming numbers of red soldiers, 1,000 opposing troops armed with rifles were able to defeat Zeng Zhongsheng's forces.

Submachine guns 
The submachine gun used by the Chinese Red Army was the MP 18. The MP 18s were captured from the Nationalist forces which had purchased them from Germany. The Red Army's elite troops often used these weapons in order to rapidly defeat the enemy forces.

Artillery 
The Chinese Red Army made use of artillery seized from the enemy forces. Most of the time the Red Armies only had mortars, with typically every army having three to five mortars. During the summer of 1930, Peng Dehuai's Fifth Army captured two 75mm mountain guns in Yuezhou, but they lacked the required ammunition.

Aircraft 
In the spring of 1931, the Fourth Red Army captured a Nationalist forces' reconnaissance aircraft in eastern Hubei Province. The pilot, Long Wenguang, joined the Red Army and assisted them in attacking the enemy army. Before the Fourth Red Army retreated from its base area, the aircraft was concealed by local farmers and was found again in 1951. The First Red Army also captured two reconnaissance aircraft in 1932.

References 

Military units and formations established in 1928
1928 establishments in China
Military history of China
History of the Chinese Communist Party
People's Liberation Army